Tu Amor Secreto (Eng:Your Secret Love) is a studio album released by Grupo Bryndis.

Track list

Tu Traicion  
Eres  
Secreto Amor  
Tu Lugar Se Ocupo  
Sabias Que Te Amo  
Solo Te Amo A Ti  
Quien Vive En Mi  
Extranandote  
Amor, Te Necesito  
Carino No Hay Soledad

References 

Grupo Bryndis albums
1995 albums
Disa Records albums